Presidential elections were held in Guatemala between 17 and 19 December 1944. The October Revolution had overthrown Jorge Ubico, the American-backed dictator, after which a junta composed of Francisco Javier Arana, Jacobo Árbenz and Jorge Toriello took power, and quickly announced presidential elections, as well as elections for a constitutional assembly. The subsequent elections were broadly considered free and fair, although only literate men were given the vote. Unlike in similar historical situations, none of the junta members stood for election. The front-runner was the philosophically conservative University professor Juan José Arévalo, of the National Renovation Party. His closest challenger was Adrián Recinos, whose campaign included a number of individuals identified with the Ubico regime. The ballots were tallied on 19 December and Arévalo won in a landslide with 86.25% of the vote, receiving more than four times as many votes as the other candidates combined. The Constitutional Assembly elections took place on 28–30 December, with the United Front of Arevalist Parties winning 50 of the 65 seats.

Results

References

Bibliography
Villagrán Kramer, Francisco. Biografía política de Guatemala: años de guerra y años de paz. FLACSO-Guatemala, 2004. 
Political handbook of the world 1946. New York, 1945. 
Rodríguez de Ita, Guadalupe. 2003. La participación política en la primavera guatemalteca: una aproximación a la historia de los partidos durante el periodo 1944-1954. México: Universidad Autónoma del Estado de México, Universidad Nacional Autónoma de México.
El estado y los partidos politicos en Guatemala, 1944-1951. by José Campang Chang Published in 1992, Universidad de San Carlos de Guatemala ([Guatemala])
Castillo, R. Geografía Electoral de Guatemala, Guatemala, INCEP, 1972.

Presidential elections in Guatemala
Guatemala
1944 in Guatemala
Guatemalan Revolution